Nicolas Mercado (born 10 July 1960) is a Colombian weightlifter. He competed in the men's bantamweight event at the 1984 Summer Olympics.

References

External links
 

1960 births
Living people
Colombian male weightlifters
Olympic weightlifters of Colombia
Weightlifters at the 1984 Summer Olympics
Central American and Caribbean Games medalists in weightlifting
Place of birth missing (living people)
20th-century Colombian people